Alexander or Alex Rose may refer to:

 Alexander Rose (bishop) (1647–1720)
 Alexander Rose (geologist) (1781–1860), Scottish geologist
 Alexander Rose (author) (born 1971), author and historian
 Alex Rose (labor leader) (1898–1976), New York politician
 Alex Rose (athlete) (b. 1991), American/Samoan discus thrower
 Alexander Rose, Executive Director of the Long Now Foundation
 Alex Rose, musician, member of Minus the Bear

See also
 Axl Rose (born 1962), American musician